Bitch may refer to:
 A female dog or other canine
 Bitch (slang), a vulgar slur for a human female

Bitch or bitches may also refer to:

Arts and media

Film and television 
 The Bitch (film), a 1979 film starring Joan Collins
 Bitch (film), a 2017 dark comedy film starring Marianna Palka
 "Bitches" (Pushing Daisies), an episode of Pushing Daisies
 Isn't Life a Bitch?, alternate title of Jean Renoir's 1931 film, La Chienne (The Bitch)

Music

Performers
 Bitch (band), an American heavy metal band
 Bitch (performer), a musician, formerly of queercore duo "Bitch and Animal"

Songs 
 "Bitch" (Rolling Stones song), 1971
 "Bitch" (Meredith Brooks song), 1997
 "Bitch" (E-40 song), 2010
 "Bitch", a song by Sevendust from the album Sevendust, 1998

 "Bitches" (song), a 2018 song by Tove Lo
 "Bitches", a song by Insane Clown Posse featuring Ol' Dirty Bastard and the Jerky Boys from the album The Amazing Jeckel Brothers, 1999
 "Bitches", a song by Mindless Self Indulgence from the album Frankenstein Girls Will Seem Strangely Sexy, 2000
 "Bitches", a song by Hollywood Undead from the EP Swan Songs Rarities, 2010
 "B.I.T.C.H.", a 2020 song by Megan Thee Stallion

Other media
 Bitch (magazine)
 "Bitch" (short story), by Roald Dahl
 The Bitch (novel), by Jackie Collins

Geographical
 Bitch Creek, a stream in Idaho, U.S.
 Bitch Mountain, a mountain in New York, U.S.
 The Bitches, rocks near Ramsey Island, Pembrokeshire

Other uses 
 BITCH-100, or Black Intelligence Test of Cultural Homogeneity, a psychometric test
 Bitches (cards), one of the many nicknames for a pair of queens in card games

See also
 Bitchin (disambiguation)
 Bitching (disambiguation)